A nūniyya (plural  ) is an Arabic poetic form in which each line ends with an n sound, coming either from the letter  (nun) or from nunation. This creates the consonant rhyme scheme of the poem.

Among the most famous nuniyyas are the Nuniyya of Ibn Zaydun, the Nuniyya of Khidr Bey, the Nuniyya of Ibn Qayyim, the Nuniyya of Imam al-Qahtani al-Andalusi, the Nuniyya of Abu al-Fath al-Busti, and "Ritha' al-Andalus" by Abu al-Baqa ar-Rundi.

References

Arabic poetry forms